Captain is a 1999 Indian Malayalam film, directed by Nissar and produced by Anil Menon. The film stars Vani Viswanath, Babu Antony, Captain Raju, Roopa Sri, Baiju and Jagathy Sreekumar in the lead roles. The film has musical score by Alleppey Ranganath.

Cast

Vani Viswanath as Renuka Varma
Babu Antony as Ranger Haridas
Captain Raju as Ranger Jayadevan
Roopa Sri 
Jagathy Sreekumar as Ananthan Menon
Kalabhavan Mani as Sathyanathan
Baiju as Rajan
Madhupal as David
Sadiq as C.I. Antony
Abu Salim as Keshavan
American Achayan
Bheeman Raghu as Rangam
Bobby Kottarakkara 
Devan as James Samuel
Jose Pellissery as Alex
Master Aswin
Shakeela 
Usha

Soundtrack
The music was composed by Alleppey Ranganath.

References

1999 films
1990s Malayalam-language films
Films directed by Nissar